The Stanhope Public Schools is a community public school district that serves students in kindergarten through eighth grade from Stanhope, in Sussex County, New Jersey, United States.

As of the 2021–22 school year, the district, comprised of one school, had an enrollment of 292 students and 30.1 classroom teachers (on an FTE basis), for a student–teacher ratio of 9.7:1.

The district is classified by the New Jersey Department of Education as being in District Factor Group "GH", the third-highest of eight groupings. District Factor Groups organize districts statewide to allow comparison by common socioeconomic characteristics of the local districts. From lowest socioeconomic status to highest, the categories are A, B, CD, DE, FG, GH, I and J.

For ninth through twelfth grades, the borough shares Lenape Valley Regional High School, which serves public school students from Netcong in Morris County and the Sussex County community of Byram Township. As of the 2021–22 school year, the high school had an enrollment of 657 students and 54.1 classroom teachers (on an FTE basis), for a student–teacher ratio of 12.1:1. Students from the borough had attended Sparta High School until 1974, when the Lenape Valley district was created.

Schools
Schools in the district (with 2021–22 enrollment from the National Center for Education Statistics) are:
Valley Road Elementary (PreK-8; 299)
Alicia Finklea-DiCataldo, Principal

Administration
Core members of the district's administration are:
Steven Hagemann, Superintendent
Debi LeBrun, Business Administrator / Board Secretary

Board of education
The district's board of education, comprised of seven members, sets policy and oversees the fiscal and educational operation of the district through its administration. As a Type II school district, the board's trustees are elected directly by voters to serve three-year terms of office on a staggered basis, with either two or three seats up for election each year held (since 2012) as part of the November general election. The board appoints a superintendent to oversee the district's day-to-day operations and a business administrator to supervise the business functions of the district.

References

External links
Stanhope Public Schools

Data for the Stanhope Public Schools, National Center for Education Statistics
Lenape Valley Regional High School

New Jersey District Factor Group GH
School districts in Sussex County, New Jersey
Stanhope, New Jersey
Public K–8 schools in New Jersey